Whiteabbey Railway Station serves the village of Whiteabbey in Newtownabbey, Northern Ireland.

History

The station was opened by the Belfast and Ballymena Railway on 11 April 1848.

The station buildings were erected in 1863–1864, and the waiting room on the down platform was built in the 1890s. These buildings have since been demolished and replaced with basic NIR shelters.

After Whiteabbey, the next station down the Larne line used to be Bleach Green Halt, but this was closed in May 1977. Close to the Bleach Green Viaducts.

Service

It is the first station outside Belfast on the Larne Line.

The first train out on weekdays is the 06:15 to Whitehead  and last train in is at 23:10.

On Saturdays, there are fewer peak time trains, but the service remains half-hourly.

On Sundays, there is an hourly service on the Larne Line.

No other Belfast-Derry services call at Whiteabbey outside of special circumstances.

Facilities

At Whiteabbey there are 2 carparks, one at each platform. The station could be considered accessible to those who are mobility impaired, with steps and ramps.

There are benches and shelters on each platform.

At the end of the Belfast platform, there is a footpath (not signposted) that runs alongside the railway to Dillon's Avenue. The residential street has access to the main road through Whiteabbey.

References

Railway stations in County Antrim
Railway stations opened in 1848
Railway stations served by NI Railways
Newtownabbey
Railway stations in Northern Ireland opened in 1848